Gorska may refer to:

Górska, a Polish-language feminine surname
Gorska, Bulgaria, a village in Elena Municipality, Veliko Tarnovo Province